EIQ may refer to:
 Ei-Q (1911–1960), Japanese artist
 EIQ Energy, an American solar energy company
 Emotional intelligence quotient